Mecas sericea is a species of flat-faced longhorn in the beetle family Cerambycidae. It is found in Mexico.

References

Saperdini
Beetles described in 1864